Pseudoruminant is a classification of animals based on their digestive tract differing from the ruminants. Hippopotami and camels are ungulate mammals with a three-chambered stomach (ruminants have a four-chambered stomach) while equids (horses, asses, zebras) and rhinoceroses are monogastric herbivores.

Anatomy 
Like ruminants, some pseudoruminants may use foregut fermentation to break down cellulose in fibrous plant species (while most others are hindgut fermenters with a large cecum). But they have three-chambered stomachs (while others are monogastric) as opposed to ruminant stomachs which have four compartments.

Species

See also 

 Traditional ruminant

References 

Mammal taxonomy
Animal anatomy
Herbivorous mammals